GEW Energy Dome is an indoor sporting arena located in Cologne, Germany. The seating capacity of the arena is for 3,232 people and it is home to the Köln 99ers basketball team.

References

Indoor arenas in Germany
Sport in Cologne
Sports venues in Cologne
Buildings and structures in Cologne
Sports venues in North Rhine-Westphalia